William W. "W.W." Albers (May 20, 1860 – January 31, 1951) was an American politician and businessman.

Born in New Holstein, Wisconsin, Albers went to Lawrence University and University of Wisconsin–Madison. He worked in a pharmaceutical business in Chicago, Illinois and graduated from the Chicago College of Pharmacy in 1884. He then moved to Wausau, Wisconsin and open several pharmacies. Albers served on the Wausau Common Council, the Marathon County, Wisconsin Board of Supervisors, and the Wausau School Board. Albers served in the Wisconsin State Senate as a Democrat from 1911 to 1919. He retired in Fort Lauderdale, Florida and died there in 1951.

Notes

1860 births
1951 deaths
People from New Holstein, Wisconsin
Politicians from Wausau, Wisconsin
University of Illinois Chicago alumni
Lawrence University alumni
University of Wisconsin–Madison alumni
Businesspeople from Wisconsin
Democratic Party Wisconsin state senators
Wisconsin city council members
County supervisors in Wisconsin
School board members in Wisconsin